Geneva Public Transport (TPG) operates most of the public transportation system in canton of Geneva, Switzerland, including the city of Geneva. The agency's head office is in Grand-Lancy, Lancy.

The TPG operates trams, trolleybuses and buses for the canton of Geneva and also serves some regions in neighbouring France. Local rail services are provided by the CFF (Swiss Federal Railways) and the SNCF, and passenger ferries across the lake by the Mouettes Genevoises Navigation. The TPG shares a common fare system (Unireso) with these services and some in neighbouring France so that a single ticket can be used for any public transport within its zones and times of validity.

Timeline
The TPG is the successor organization to the Compagnie Genevoise des Tramways Électriques (Geneva Electric Tramway Company), or CGTE, which operated trams throughout the canton and parts of neighbouring France from 1900 until 1 January 1977.

The bus can carry 150 passengers. It entered passenger service in January 2004 on line 10 to the airport. This vehicle was created by adding a middle section to a trolleybus that was originally a single-articulated,  vehicle. In 2005–06, TPG purchased ten all-new double-articulated trolleybuses from Hess, length , and they are numbered 781-790. As of late 2006, TPG's fleet included 92 trolleybuses, all articulated (of which eleven were double-articulated).

As of 27 April 2008, the TPG network includes 6 tramway routes, 38 cantonal bus routes, 15 intercantonal (Canton of Vaud) and international (France) bus routes and 12 nighttime bus routes.

In December 2010, Line 18 opened, from Avanchet to Coutance; it was extended as far as CERN in May 2011, closed in December 2011 and replaced by Line 14. In December 2012, the tramway was again split into line 14 (Meyrin-Gravière – P+R Bernex) and line 18 (CERN – Carouge).

Tramway Cornavin - Onex - Bernex (TCOB)
Construction started in November 2008 and finished in December 2011. Line 14 originally ran from P+R Bernex to Meyrin-Gravière or CERN, but has since then been split into Line 14 (P+R Bernex – Meyrin-Gravière) and Line 18 (Carouge – CERN) in December 2012.

See also

Trams in Geneva
Trolleybuses in Geneva
Buses in Geneva

References

External links

  Unofficial Fan website news, resources and history of TPG and CGTE.

Public transport in Switzerland
Railway companies of Switzerland
Transport in Geneva

ru:Женевский трамвай